Eric Bengtson (31 July 1897 – 6 April 1948) was a Swedish composer who worked on many film scores. In 1938 he composed the music for the Ingrid Bergman film A Woman's Face (1938).

Selected filmography
 Cavaliers of the Crown (1930)
 Frida's Songs (1930)
 The Red Day (1931)
 Colourful Pages (1931)
 Servant's Entrance (1932)
 Love and Deficit (1932)
 People of Hälsingland (1933)
 Two Men and a Widow (1933)
 Boman's Boy (1933)
 Simon of Backabo (1934)
 Andersson's Kalle (1934)
 Fired (1934)
 Walpurgis Night (1935)
 Ocean Breakers (1935)
 Johan Ulfstjerna (1936)
 It Pays to Advertise (1936)
 The Family Secret (1936)
 Russian Flu (1937)
 John Ericsson, Victor of Hampton Roads (1937)
 Conflict (1937)
 Hotel Paradise (1937)
 Thunder and Lightning (1938)
 A Woman's Face (1938)
 Art for Art's Sake (1938)
 Dollar (1938)
 The Great Love (1938)
 Styrman Karlssons flammor (1938)
 Only One Night (1939)
 I Am Fire and Air (1944)

References

Bibliography 
  Soila, Tytti. The Cinema of Scandinavia. Wallflower Press, 2005.

External links 
 

1897 births
1948 deaths
Swedish composers
Swedish male composers
20th-century composers
20th-century Swedish male musicians
20th-century Swedish musicians